Step in the Arena is the second studio album by hip hop duo Gang Starr, printed as a 1990 release, and commercially released on January 15, 1991. In 2007, it was named the greatest hip hop album of all time by IGN. HipHopDX called it "the album that cemented Gang Starr as a timeless tag team."

Background
Filmmaker Spike Lee was a fan of Gang Starr's debut No More Mr. Nice Guy, particularly the song "Jazz Music". As Lee was filming Mo' Better Blues at the time of the album's release, he felt the duo needed to expand on the song's theme - which became the single "Jazz Thing". Lee introduced them to a poem written by Lolis Eric Elie, which group member Guru converted to a rap, as the poem didn't rhyme. The song caught the attention of Chrysalis Records, who offered them a deal based on "Jazz Thing". However, DJ Premier said the label had gotten the wrong idea of the group, stating: "When they signed us, they thought we were going to do records like "Jazz Thing" all the time. When we were just doing that for Mo' Better Blues".

Critical reception

In his review for The Source, Reef wrote: "Step in the Arena stands alone on a musical level, yet it also remains true to hip-hop's underground heritage."

Legacy

In addition to IGN.com and HipHopDX's accolades, the album was also included in the book 1001 Albums You Must Hear Before You Die.  In 1998, the album was selected as one of The Source'''s 100 Best Hip Hop Albums.

In popular culture

The song "Who's Gonna Take the Weight" was remixed by DJ Premier for use in the video game Grand Theft Auto IV.  "Step In the Arena" was on the video games Skate It and Skate 2, and "Just to Get a Rep" was on Thrasher: Skate and Destroy''.

Track listing

Personnel
 Guru – rapping, production, mixing
 DJ Premier – beats, scratching, production, mixing
 Lisle Leete – piano, engineering
 Shlomo Sonnenfeld – engineering
 Yoram Vazam – engineering
 Howie Weinberg – mastering
 Marc Cozza – art direction, design
 Rick Patrick – logo

Charts

Album

Singles

References

1991 albums
Gang Starr albums
Albums produced by DJ Premier
Albums produced by Guru
Chrysalis Records albums